Hut 6 was a wartime section of the Government Code and Cypher School (GC&CS) at Bletchley Park, Buckinghamshire,  Britain, tasked with the solution of German Army and Air Force Enigma machine cyphers. Hut 8, by contrast, attacked Naval Enigma. Hut 6 was established at the initiative of Gordon Welchman, and was run initially by Welchman and fellow Cambridge mathematician John Jeffreys.

Welchman's deputy, Stuart Milner-Barry, succeeded Welchman as head of Hut 6 in September 1943, at which point over 450 people were working in the section.

Hut 6 was partnered with Hut 3, which handled the translation and intelligence analysis of the raw decrypts provided by Hut 6.

Location
Hut 6 was originally named after the building in which the section was located. Welchman says the hut was 20 yards (18m) long by 10 yards (9m) wide, with two large rooms at the far end – and no toilets. Staff had to go to another building. Irene Young recalled that she "worked in Room 82, though in typical Bletchley fashion there were not eighty-one rooms preceding it". She was glad to move from the Decoding Room "where all the operators were constantly having nervous breakdowns on account of the pace of work and the appalling noise" to the Registration Room which arranged intercepts according to callsign and frequency. 

As the number of personnel increased, the section moved to additional buildings around Bletchley Park, but its name was retained, with each new location also being known as 'Hut 6'. The original building was then renamed 'Hut 16'.

Personnel
John Jeffreys was initially in charge of the Hut with Gordon Welchman until May 1940; Jeffreys was diagnosed ill in 1940, and died in 1944. Welchman became official head of section until autumn 1943, subsequently rising to Assistant Director of Mechanisation at Bletchley Park. Hugh Alexander, was a member February 1940 – March 1941 before moving to become head of Hut 8. Stuart Milner-Barry joined early 1940 and was in charge from autumn 1943 to the end of the war.

One codebreaker concerned with Cryptanalysis of the Enigma, John Herivel, discovered what was soon dubbed the Herivel tip or Herivelismus. For a brief but critical few months from May 1940, the "tip", in conjunction with operating shortcomings or "cillies", were the main techniques used to solve Enigma. The "tip" was an insight into the habits of the German machine operators allowing Hut 6 to easily deduce part of the daily key. David Rees is credited with the first decode using the Herivel Tip.

In 1942, Welchman recruited  fellow Marlborough Collegers, Bob Roseveare and Nigel Forward. Roseveare started in the Watch  working on Luftwaffe messages before moving to the Quatch, a small backroom group that decoded non-current messages.

In Hut 6 were the Machine Room, plus the Decoding Room and Registration Room with mainly female staff under Harold Fletcher, a school and university friend of Gordon Welchman. In 2014 one of these female staff, Mair Russell-Jones, published a posthumous memoir of her work there.

Other notable individuals include:

 Alexander Aitken, New Zealand and Scottish mathematician
 James Macrae Aitken, Scottish chess player 
 Madge E. Allen
 Dennis Babbage
 Stephen Banister, English cricketer and civil servant
 Clarence Barasch, American observer to British Intelligence
 Asa Briggs, English historian 
 June Canney, Registration Room later Welchman's secretary 
 John Coleman and George Crawford, Intercept Control Room.
 Sheila Dunlop (later Lady Killanin)  
 Harold Fletcher, administrator  
 Edna Garbutt, member of A watch
 John Herivel, creator of the "Herivel Tip"
 Jane Hughes, later Jane Hughes Fawcett, who decoded the message that led to the sinking of the German battleship Bismarck
 Ione Jay, (Ione Roseveare) wrote an account of her experiences there
 Oliver Lawn, married 1948 Sheila who worked elsewhere at BP, Scottish country dancer.
 Reginald H. Parker (Reg), discoverer of "Parkerismus", in Hut 6 Intercept Control Room 
 David Rees, University of Exeter mathematics professor
 Helen C. Stanley-Baker, Oxford mathematics student
 Derek Taunt, Cambridge research student 
 Ann Katharine Mitchell (nee Williamson), Oxford mathematics graduate
 Irene Young, University of Edinburgh, Decoding Room then Registration Room

See also
 Action This Day (memo) 
 Bombe
 Cryptanalysis of the Enigma
 Hut 8
 Bletchley
 Milton Keynes

References

Sources 

 Stuart Milner-Barry, "Hut 6: Early days", pp. 89–99 in Codebreakers: The Inside Story of Bletchley Park, edited by F. H. Hinsley, and Alan Stripp, Oxford University Press, 2003 
  
 Derek Taunt, "Hut 6: 1941-1945", pp. 100–112 in Codebreakers: The Inside Story of Bletchley Park, edited by F. H. Hinsley, and Alan Stripp, Oxford University Press, 2003
 Gordon Welchman, The Hut Six Story: Breaking the Enigma Codes (1982: London, Allen Lane & New York, McGraw-Hill) 
 Gordon Welchman, The Hut Six Story: Breaking the Enigma Codes (1997: Cleobury Mortimer, Baldwin)  
 Irene Young, Enigma Variations: A Memoir of Love and War (1990, Mainstream Publishing, Edinburgh) 
Alan Turing, Gordon Welchman, Hugh Alexander, Stuart Milner-Barry. Letter (memo) to Winston Churchill (1941)

Year of establishment missing
Cryptography organizations
Bletchley Park
Buildings and structures in Milton Keynes